Cahersiveen railway station was on the Great Southern and Western Railway (GS&WR) which ran from Farranfore to Valentia Harbour in the Republic of Ireland.  The station served Cahersiveen in County Kerry.

History
The station was opened on 12 September 1893.

Cahersiveen was the main station towards the end of the branch, and was equipped with locomotive shed and turntable.

Cahersiveen was the principal settlement in the area, having 1,800 inhabitants and two hotels.  Horse-drawn buses, then later charabancs, would be available from the nearly hotel to take tourists round the Ring of Kerry scenic route.

The station closed on 1 February 1960, the last service train having run on 30 January 1960.

Route

References

Footnotes

Sources
 
 
 

Disused railway stations in County Kerry
Railway stations opened in 1893
Railway stations closed in 1960
Farranfore–Valentia Harbour line
Cahersiveen